Sun Yefang (24 October 1908 – 22 February 1983) was a pioneering Chinese economist.

Biography 

Sun was born in Wuxi County (now Wuxi), Jiangsu, on 24 October 1908. His elder brother  (1895–1980) was a politician in the government of the Republic of China. His cousin Xue Muqiao was a economist and politician.

He studied at Sun Yat-sen University and after graduation, he taught political economy and translation at Zhongshan University and at Moscow East Worker University.

In 1930, he returned to China to take part in organizing the China Rural Economy Research Association. He also edited the journal Zhongguo Nongcun (中国农村, Rural China).

After the Chinese Civil War, he held positions as head of the Department of Heavy Industry, Shanghai Military Control Commission; Assistant Commissioner, State Statistical Bureau; Director, Economics Institute at the Chinese Academy of Science; Commissioner, Fifth Session of Chinese People's Political Consultative Conference; delegate, 12th National Party Congress; member, Advisory Commission of the Central Committee of the CCP; member, State Council Academic Appraisal Committee.

Sun advocated market-oriented reforms and was denounced by the Maoists as "China's Liberman" (referring to the Khrushchev-era economist Evsei Liberman) as a result of a damaging association with Liu Shaoqi, who was known as China's Khrushchev".

He was associated with the career of pioneer post-Marxist Chinese liberal Gu Zhun, acting as the latter's protector during anti-Rightist purges to which he himself was eventually to succumb.

Personal life 
Sun married Feng Keping, and had an adopted daughter named Li Zhao.

References 

1908 births
1983 deaths
Republic of China economists
National Sun Yat-sen University alumni
Educators from Wuxi
20th-century  Chinese economists
People's Republic of China economists
Republic of China writers
People's Republic of China writers
Writers from Wuxi
Economists from Jiangsu
Victims of the Cultural Revolution